This article lists the Hellenistic princes and kings of Cappadocia, an ancient region in central Anatolia.

Independent princes of Cappadocia, 331 BC – 250s BC
Ariarathes I, 331–322 BC
The hitherto satrap, Ariarathes I managed to keep control of most or all Cappadocia, as independent prince leading the resistance against conquerors, even after Alexander the Great's conquest of the Persians; however, in 322 BC, he was crucified by Perdiccas, Alexander's general and (after Alexander's death) regent.
 temporary suppression of independence, governors of Macedon Empire held the country
 governor Eumenes
 diadoch Antigonos, firstly satrap of Phrygia and then Regent. He was killed in Ipsos in 301 BCE.
Perdiccas gave Cappadocia to Eumenes, Alexander's former secretary. However, during the instability of the ongoing Wars of the Diadochi, Eumenes was killed, and then the regent Antigonos was killed.

Ariarathes I's adopted son, Ariarathes II, managed to re-secure some of his inheritance, namely the mere Upper Cappadocia around Mazaca, and became Prince of Cappadocia (while accepting Seleucid suzerainty). The Lower Cappadocia was lost forever to Kingdom of Pontos which emerged since 301 BCE in the coast of Black Sea, and proclaimed Kingdom in circa 281 BCE.
Ariarathes II, 301–280 BC
Ariamnes II, 280–230 BC

Kings of Cappadocia, 250s BC – 17 AD 
Possibly continuing a while under weak Seleucid suzerainty, title recognized as Kings:
Ariarathes III, 255–220 BC, started as co-ruler with his father Ariamnes II
Ariarathes IV Eusebes, 220–163 BC
Ariarathes V Eusebes Philopator, 163–130 BC
Orophernes, 157 BC
Ariarathes VI Epiphanes Philopator, 130–116 BC
Ariarathes VII Philometor, 116–101 BC
Ariarathes VIII, 101–96 BC
Ariarathes IX, 100-85 BC
Ariobarzanes I Philoromaios, 95–c. 63 BC
Ariobarzanes II Philopator, c. 63–51 BC
Ariobarzanes III Eusebes Philoromaios, 51–42 BC
Ariarathes X Eusebes Philadelphos, 42–36 BC
Archelaus, 36 BC–17 AD

Family tree of kings of Cappadocia

Cappadocia